Penicuik Athletic Football Club are a Scottish football club. They were formed in 1888 and are based at Penicuik Park, in the town of Penicuik. Penicuik Park is ten miles south west of Edinburgh on the A702 road. The team now plays in the East of Scotland Football League Premier Division, having moved from the junior leagues in 2018.

History

The Beginning
Penicuik turned Junior in 1951 with the supporter's club buying Eastfield Park from the National Coal Board and built a new pavilion. The new ground was opened with a match against a strong Hibernian side which the Athletic lost 5–0.

The chairman at the time, Mr David Masson and Jimmy Ketchen, were two prominent figures in the club. Their manager was Dick Walker and coach Harry Verth.

Penicuik won their first silverware in 1949–50 season (before turning Junior) winning the Border Cup.

In 1966 the Athletic reached the semi-final of the Scottish Junior Cup only to lose by the narrowest of margins to local rivals Bonnyrigg Rose.

Scottish Junior Cup Final Run 1969–70
Penicuik Athletic's biggest achievement is undoubtedly reaching the Scottish Junior Cup Final in 1970 at Hampden Park, Glasgow. Penicuik's opponents on Saturday 16 May 1970 was Blantyre Victoria who they drew with 1–1, only to be defeated in the replay the following Tuesday night 1–0. The crowd at the final was in excess of 30,000, with the replay attendance published at 14,225.

Penicuik beat seven Junior clubs based in the West of Scotland to arrive at the final. Here is how it was done in 1970:

Round 1 v Tannochside Rec. (a) 3–1
Round 2 v Wishaw Juniors (h) 4–1
Round 3 v Renfrew Juniors (h) 4–1
Round 4 v Cumnock (h) 3–1
Round 5 v Carluke Rovers (h) 0–0, Carluke Rovers (a) 0–0, Carluke (Shotts) 2–1
Round 6 v Vale of Leven (a) 3–1 – Attendance 5,034
Semi-Final v Ashfield (Brockville Park, Falkirk) 1–0

The team on Cup Final day:

McDermott, Thorburn, McCabe, Hume, McGarry, Hogg, Robertson, Wallace, Stenhouse, Buchan, Murphy, Sub - Reeves.

Abeyance
The 1970s saw probably the most successful period in the club's history when a social club was built at the ground. Many local trophies were won and the team was considered as one of the leading teams in the East of Scotland. However the biggest prize of all, the Scottish Junior Cup still eluded the Athletic despite the club's best efforts.

The club's fortunes fell into decline both on and off the park in the 1980s and the Social Club was forced to close in 1986 with mounting debts. The park had been used as security for various loans and the creditors put the park up for sale to clear the debts. The team continued to play despite the off-field problems and were showing signs of revival when a near fatal blow was delivered as the ground was sold on to be developed into a supermarket which stands on Eastfield Park today.

Throughout the 1990s several initiatives were embarked on to secure a new pitch but for a variety of reasons were unsuccessful. The last and ultimately successful project to establish a pitch which met the criteria laid down by the Scottish Junior Football Association grew out of an initiative by three local Midlothian Councillors, Russell Imrie, David Fletcher and Adam Montgomery to improve recreational facilities in Penicuik.

Return to playing and the Willie McGinley years
However they reformed in 2002 playing at their new home Penicuik Park in the centre of the town.

Penicuik decided to set up a competition to design a club badge/logo which would be on the football strip and letterheads etc. In order to involve the local community, four local primary schools were invited to submit designs to the club. The schools involved were: Sacred Heart, Cornbank, Mauricewood and Cuikin Primary schools. There were over 100 entries to the competition and the winning design was submitted by Scott Anderson.  Scott was presented with a plaque of the logo and a complete Penicuik Athletic youth strip. A plaque is displayed in the new changing rooms. The presentation was made to the winner, Scott Anderson, age 11, from Mauricewood Primary, by Club President, John Fraser and Councillor Adam Montgomery.

Penicuik Athletic were accepted back into the re-organised East Region (with the introduction of the Super League) and took their place in the second division in season 2002–03. The long-awaited first game was played at Armadale in the first round of the League Cup on 6 August 2002, resulting in a 5–1 defeat. Over 500 spectators turned up at the new pitch in Penicuik Park on Saturday 8 August to witness a no scoring draw in a league match against Harthill Royal. Re-entry into the Scottish Junior Cup saw a win against Blackburn before defeat in the next round against an experienced Renfrew Juniors. Penicuik just missed out by a point on promotion to the first division after a 1–0 defeat in their final league match against West Calder which was controversially switched to be played on a Thursday night.

The following season saw promotion again narrowly missed with another third-placed finish. However, the club won its first trophy, the Supplementary Cup when a late Brian Hancock goal secured victory over Whitburn in the final played at Blackburn Utd's Murrayfield Park. The manager that night was Willie McGinley and of the team below only Billy Bald remains at the club. Paul Lindsay and Brian Hancock scored in the 2–1 win.

The cup winning team was:

Bald, McDermott, Ure, Porteous, Blair, Montgomery, Dick, Hancock, Lindsay (Banks 73), Auld (Gibb 73), Forbes (Hope 73), Subs not used - Rennie, McLeod

Further success was to follow for McGinley's side as they won the Lothians League Division Two title in 2004–05 with 41 points from 18 games played. As a result, Penicuik Athletic were awarded Midlothian Council's Senior Team Award in their annual Greatest Achievement in Sport awards. The following season they finished second in Division One and gained a place in the new East Premier League. Penicuik were also beaten finalists in the pre-season League Cup going down by the odd goal to Musselburgh Athletic.

The Athletic found the going tough in the new Premier League and narrowly escaped one of the three relegation slots back to the District League. They narrowly avoided relegation with a last match win over Scottish Junior Cup finalists Kelty Hearts at Penicuik Park, in front of a 500+ crowd. Penicuik lost in the final of the Brown Cup to Bonnyrigg Rose after defeating Scottish Junior Cup finalists Linlithgow Rose in an earlier round.

Penicuik improved their position in the Premier League by finishing in sixth place in the 12 team league during Season 2007–08. Irvine Meadow came to Penicuik in the first round of the Scottish Junior Cup and won by four goals to three while the club did not progress beyond the third round stage in any of the local cup competitions. At the end of the season, Willie McGinlay who had been team manager since the team started playing again in 2002, stood down for business and personal reasons.

Stuart 'Snowy' McKean takes charge

Manager McGinley stood down after six-years in charge in May 2008 and was replaced by his assistant Stuart 'Snowy' McKean, who had a distinguished junior playing career with Armadale Thistle and Bonnyrigg Rose. Season 2008–09 saw a further improvement in the league position with Penicuik finishing in fourth place. Penicuik's best performance in the local cup competitions was reaching the semi final of the St. Michael's Cup only to lose out at home to Linlithgow Rose in a penalty shoot out. However the following season, Penicuik started poorly. Failure to qualify from the sectional league cup was followed by a first round knock out in the Scottish Junior cup. A run of only one win in seven league matches before an enforced break for bad weather saw Penicuik drop into second bottom spot in the Premier League. McKean resigned in December 2009 and was replaced by the duo of the then club captain Craig Meikle, and former player Brian Ryrie.

The Meikle/Ryrie years

Former player Brian Ryrie and current player Craig Meikle were chosen from a strong list of applicants to replace McKean. Despite losing their first match in charge, sufficient points were gained from the remaining league fixtures to claim seventh spot in the league, finishing clear of the three relegation spots. There were second round exits in both the East of Scotland and Fife & Lothians Cup. The St. Michael's and Brown Cups went uncontested because of the length of the break for the bad weather.

Their first full season in charge saw several changes made to the playing squad and the league position showed an improvement with fifth place being achieved. A missed penalty in the last-minute, when the scores were level, proved costly in the first round Scottish Junior cup tie at Kilwinning as the home replay was lost. Penicuik did not progress from their league cup section but enjoyed good runs to the semi finals of both the East of Scotland and Fife and Lothians Cup, losing to Newtongrange Star and Bo'ness United respectively.

Promotion to the Super League was the target for season 2011–12 and it went right down to the wire. Penicuik went into their last league game of the season at Broxburn Athletic needing a win to gain the second promotion spot but lost out to the home side who were promoted in their place. Penicuik finished fourth in a very tight finish. Broxburn were also Penicuik's downfall in the League Cup where Penicuik topped the section but were pipped by Broxburn who successfully appealed against Livingston fielding an ineligible player in their tie, and as a result progressed to the knock out stages. Early exits were suffered in both the East of Scotland and Fife and Lothians Cup. After first and second round Scottish Junior Cup wins against Glenrothes and Glasgow Perthshire, eventual runners-up and Junior giants, Auchinleck Talbot proved too strong in the third round, handing out a six-goal defeat at Auchinleck.

Season 2012–13 was a stop-start one, with Penicuik only having played nine competitive games, following the pre-season League Cup, due to weather and the postponement of their Junior Cup tie against Kelty Hearts, by January. Promotion went to the last day of the season again with Penicuik in a three-way battle with Bathgate Thistle and Armadale Thistle. Despite Penicuik winning 2–0 against Broughty, Armadale were promoted after their victory at the same time. Penicuik's Scottish Junior Cup run consisted of four games, a 4–4 draw at Dunbar United and a 3–1 win at Penicuik in the first round, a 3–0 victory away to Girvan before finally crashing out in the third round to Kelty Hearts 2–1 in a match held at Oakley's Blairwood Park due to drainage problems at Kelty's ground. Penicuik didn't fare well in the other cup competitions, losing 5–3 to Newburgh in the Fife and Lothians and losing 5–2 to Ballingry Rovers in the East of Scotland second round following a 3–1 win against Forfar West End in the first round.

Co-manager Bryan Ryrie resigned from his position at the end of the season.

Penicuik's season 2013–14 was a successful one, with promotion clinched with a 1–0 away win against Livingston United in May, and the Premier League Championship following later that month with a 2–1 home win against runners-up Fauldhouse United thanks to goals from captain Dougie Cunnison and long-serving midfielder Ryan Gay.

The first season in the Super League saw Penicuik finish an impressive sixth, while also reaching the quarter finals of the Scottish Junior Cup for the first time since 1970, though they lost out 2-0 to eventual finalists Musselburgh Athletic.

Season 2015-16 ended in success, as Penicuik defeated new Super League Champions Bonnyrigg Rose 3-1 in the Fife and Lothians Cup Final in June at Olivebank Stadium, thanks to goals from Darrell Young, Ryan McCallum and Sean Patterson. They finished 9th in the Super League, and exited the Junior Cup with a 4-2 defeat to Lochee United in Round 3. Manager Craig Meikle resigned in June.

Johnny Harvey returns to Penicuik
Former player Johnny Harvey was appointed as the club's new manager at the beginning of July 2016, leaving his post as manager of Haddington Athletic. His first season in charge saw Penicuik finish fourth, their highest position in the top flight of Junior Football since the eighties. They progressed to the fifth round of the Scottish Junior Cup but were beaten 4-3 at home by Kirkintilloch Rob Roy. The summer of 2017 saw the departure of a number of players, including midfielder Ryan Gay, who had served the club for 11 seasons. 

Harvey's second season in charge would again see the club record their highest finish, this time ending the season in 3rd place. However success was to come in the East of Scotland Cup, where the side would defeat the holders Tranent Juniors 2-0 in the Final at Prestonfield thanks to goals from captain Craig Hume and Aaron Somerville.

Move to senior football
Penicuik was one of many eastern junior clubs that entered the East of Scotland Football League in 2018, having moved from the junior leagues.

The club would be placed into Conference A, with their first match back in Senior Football coming against former Junior opponents Sauchie, in the group stages of the East of Scotland League Cup, a 3-1 win for Penicuik thanks to an Aaron Somerville hat-trick. With the side sitting top of Conference A with a 100% record by mid-October, manager Johnny Harvey resigned from his role to move to SPFL League Two side Berwick Rangers, returning to sign three players from Penicuik weeks later - captain Craig Hume, vice-captain Lewis Barr and defender Andy Forbes. 

He would be succeeded by his former assistant manager Kevin Milne, who would be joined as co-Manager by Tony Begg in December  and the duo would lead Penicuik to the Conference A title and into the East of Scotland Championship Playoffs, finishing second to Midlothian rivals Bonnyrigg Rose in the three-way round robin, Broxburn Athletic the other side. In the following weeks, Penicuik were granted their SFA Licence, which brought with it participation in the Scottish Cup, commencing in season 2019–20.

The club took their place in the newly formed East of Scotland Premier Division for the 2019–20 season and returned to the Scottish Cup for the first time in over eighty years, winning back-to-back away Midlothian derbies in the Preliminary Rounds, against Easthouses Lily (6-1) and Whitehill Welfare (1-0).

Current squad
As of 9 March 2023

 

 

 (on loan at Edinburgh South)

 (vice-captain)

Management

Season-by-season record

Senior

† Season curtailed due to COVID-19 pandemic.
†† Season declared Null & Void due to COVID-19 pandemic

Honours 
East of Scotland Football League
Conference A Winners: 2018-19
Overall Runners-up: 2018-19

Junior East Region Premier League
Winners: 2013–14

Scottish Junior Cup
Runners-Up: 1970

Other honours
East Region Division One winners: 1978–79, 1980–81
Fife & Lothians Cup winners: 1977, 1981, 2016
East of Scotland Junior Cup winners: 1908–09, 1910–11, 2017–18
Lothian League Division 2 winners: 2004–05
Lothian League Supplementary Cup winners: 2003–04 
East of Scotland Consolation Cup winners: 1893–94, 1895–96
Marshall Cup winners: 1912–13

Recent seasons

Season 19-20 was ended early due to Covid-19 Pandemic, decided on a Points-Per-Game basis, meaning Penicuik finished in 8th place. Season 20-21 was declared null & void.

Managerial history
Since reformation in 2002
  Willie McGinley (2002– May 2008)
  Stuart McKean (May 2008 - December 2009)
  Craig Meikle & Bryan Ryrie (December 2009 – June 2013)
  Craig Meikle (June 2013 – June 2016)
  Johnny Harvey (July 2016 - October 2018)
  Kevin Milne (November 2018 - December 2018)
  Kevin Milne & Tony Begg (December 2018 – February 2020)
  Tony Begg (February 2020 - July 2021)
  Stevie McLeish (August 2021 - February 2023)
  Calum Elliot (March 2023 - )

Notable former players
 Jock Paterson, who made 283 appearances for Hibs and 33 for Ayr United.
 Eddie Thomson, who played for Hearts and Aberdeen, and also managed Australia in the 1990s.
 Malcolm Robertson, part of the 1969–70 team who went on to play for Hearts, Raith Rovers, Ayr United, Toronto Blizzard, Dundee United, Hibs & Ħamrun Spartans.
 Murray McDermott, part of the 1969–70 team who had been at Rangers and went on to play for Raith Rovers, Berwick Rangers, Morton, Arbroath, Meadowbank Thistle, Partick Thistle and Hearts.
 Lee Bullen, played for teams in China, and latterly Dunfermline, Sheffield Wednesday and Falkirk.
 Gordon Wallace, part of the 1969–70 team who went on to play for Raith Rovers.
 Kevin Twaddle, who played for Hearts and Motherwell, amongst other Scottish clubs, played for Athletic during the 2005–06 season.
 Roddy Georgeson, who played senior at Port Vale, Dundee, Raith Rovers, Berwick Rangers, Dunfermline, Montrose and Meadowbank Thistle, latterly junior at Arniston, Penicuik & Haddington.
 Andrew Seaton, Capped by Scotland at U21 level, played for Alloa Athletic, Bristol Rovers and Falkirk.
 Martin Cameron, who played for Alloa Athletic, Bristol Rovers, Partick Thistle, St Mirren, Gretna, Shamrock Rovers and Forfar Athletic.
 Derek O'Connor, played for Hearts from 1978–1984 scoring 64 goals in 184 games.
 Brad McKay, currently at Inverness CT, part of Hearts' 2014–15 SPFL Championship winning squad, spent season 2010–11 on loan at Penicuik.

References

External links
 Official club site
 Official Facebook page
 Official Twitter

Football clubs in Scotland
Scottish Junior Football Association clubs
Football in Midlothian
Association football clubs established in 1888
1888 establishments in Scotland
East of Scotland Football League teams
Penicuik
Penicuik Athletic F.C.